Metropolitan Areas in Colombia are officially designated administrative and census areas, composed of an urban center and its associated Municipalities.

Description
The following criteria must be met for a group of communities to be designated a Metropolitan Area:

 Each one of the Municipalities, the secondary cities as well as the central city, must have a population of at least 50,000 inhabitants.
 The secondary cities must integrate their city planning with that of the central city.
 At least two-thirds of those employed in the area must perform non-rural activities.
 Each of the secondary cities must have at least 10% of their workers employed in the central city.

Commuting to work is, in fact, the major characteristic of a Metropolitan Area. As a result, the secondary cities are often called "dormitory cities"; meaning places where the inhabitants only go home to sleep.

An important function of the Metropolitan Areas is to provide for joint planning between the Municipalities, thereby managing ordered and proportional economic growth according to the necessities of the area and the physical characteristics of each Municipality.

Metropolitan Areas
The following are currently (2007) recognized by the Colombian government:

External links
Se consolidan en el país las áreas metropolitanas, PORTAFOLIO, 15 de Junio de 2006
Sorpresas del censo

 
Subdivisions of Colombia